Novica Urošević (1945 – 11 November 2009) was a Serbian folk singer and composer. Some of his most famous folk song compositions include: Ne može nam niko ništa, Ne daj da nas rastave, Svako traži novu ljubav, and Poslednji boem. He had composed many songs and written lyrics for many singers, including Mitar Mirić, Zorica Brunclik, Jašar Ahmedovski, Ipče Ahmedovski, Jasmin Muharemovic, Jerina Jović, Šerif Konjević, Angel Dimov, Šeki Turković, Dragana Mirković, Zorica Marković, Nada Topčagić, Nedeljko Bajić Baja etc. He has also made great hits for Šaban Šaulić (Moj živote, drug mi nisi bio), Miroslav Ilić (Tako mi nedostaješ), and Bora Spužić Kvaka (Od noćas samo kao braća).

He died in front of his apartment in Belgrade on November 11, 2009, where the medical confirmed he was dead at the scene. He was laid to rest in his home town Drmno, and by his side were all the singers and others that gave and appreciated him the most, and they were, Vera Matović, Mitar Mirić, Ćana, Cvjetin Nikić, Rade Jorović, Šeki Turković, Ljuba Lukić, Radiša Urošević, Mića Nikolić, Dragan Aleksandrić, Branimir Djokić, etc. His friends nicknamed him "Ujka Nole".

Discography
Singles
 1968 (Dve crvene ruže)
 1971 (1) (Nema sreće bez tebe)
 1971 (2) (Bi si lepa)
 1973 (1) (Ko je on, šta je on)
 1973 (2) (Rastanak bez suza)
 1974 (1) (Ko će ludom srcu da dokaže)
 1974 (2) (Kako da preživim najtužniji dan)
 1975 (Stali smo na pola puta)
 1976 (1) (Ona hoće tvoje mesto)
 1976 (2) (Umorni su i svirači)
 1976 (3) (Hteo sam da volim samo jednu ženu)
 1977 (Izdao sam samog sebe)
 1978 (Ponovo sam pred vratima tvojim)
 1981 (Ja ne mogu da te mrzim)

Albums
 1978 (Hitovi)
 1981 (Hitovi)
 1983 (Moje Pesme, Moji Snovi)
 1985 (Ustaj, sine, zora je)
 1986 (Ne idi grlom u jagode)
 2002 (To sam ja)

Other
 1978, Kćeri moja, kome da te dam (with Zorica Brunclik)
 1983, Cuka, svira kuka (with Mitar Mirić)
 1984, Sviraju Pale i Meneka (with Mitar Mirić and Dragana Mirković)
 1990, Gde je moja ljubav

References

1945 births
2009 deaths
Musicians from Požarevac
Serbian turbo-folk singers
Serbian folk singers
Yugoslav male singers